Thomas Langford (born 12 July 1989) is a British professional boxer. He held the British middleweight title from 2016 to 2018, and the Commonwealth middleweight title in 2016.

Professional career
Langford made his professional debut on 8 September 2012, winning a four-round points decision against Steve Spence. On 4 July 2015, Langford won his first regional championship—the vacant WBO Inter-Continental middleweight title—by stopping Julio Cesar Avalos in four rounds. A breakout year in 2016 saw him first win the vacant Commonwealth middleweight title on 12 March, scoring a unanimous decision over Lewis Taylor. Langford was scheduled to face British middleweight champion Chris Eubank Jr. on 22 October, but Eubank Jr. withdrew from the fight in September due to an elbow injury. On 26 November, Langford won the then-vacant British middleweight title with a split decision against Sam Sheedy.

Langford vs. Welborn I 
On May 4, 2018, Langford fought Jason Welborn. Jason Welborn retained the British middleweight title by beating Langford via split decision, 114-113, 114-113 and 113-115.

Langford vs Welborn II 
In the rematch, the fight was as close as the first one, with Welborn again coming away with the split decision victory, winning 115-114, 114-113 and 113-114.

Langford vs. Richards 
On April 27, 2019, Langford fought Lerrone Richards for the vacant Commonwealth super middleweight championship. Richards won convincingly on the scorecards to win the Commonwealth belt, 118-110, 118-111 and 116-113.

Professional boxing record

Personal life
Langford is a supporter of West Bromwich Albion F.C.

References

External links

Tommy Langford - Profile, News Archive & Current Rankings at Box.Live

Middleweight boxers
English male boxers
1989 births
Living people
Sportspeople from Barnstaple
Commonwealth Boxing Council champions
British Boxing Board of Control champions